William Gates Building might refer to several structures named after Bill Gates, other members of the Gates family, or his former wife, Melinda French Gates:

 Gates Computer Science Building, Stanford, California, U.S.
 William Gates Building, Cambridge, University of Cambridge, England
 Gates Center for Computer Science, at Carnegie Mellon School of Computer Science, Pittsburgh, Pennsylvania, U.S.
 Bill and Melinda Gates Hall, at Cornell University, in Ithaca, New York, U.S.
 William H. Gates Building, at Massachusetts Institute of Technology, in Cambridge, Massachusetts, U.S.
 Bill and Melinda Gates Computer Science Complex, at University of Texas at Austin, U.S.
 William H. Gates Hall (Seattle), at University of Washington, in Seattle, Washington, U.S.
 Bill and Melinda Gates Center for Computer Science & Engineering, at University of Washington, in Seattle, Washington, U.S.

See also
 Gates Computer Science Building (disambiguation)
 Gates Hall (disambiguation)